Sidney is an unincorporated community in Putnam County, in the U.S. state of Missouri.

History
A post office called Sidney was established in 1889, and remained in operation until 1908. The community most likely has the name of a local citizen.

References

Unincorporated communities in Putnam County, Missouri
Unincorporated communities in Missouri